Merely Players is a lost 1918 silent film drama directed by Oscar Apfel and starring Kitty Gordon and Irving Cummings. It was produced and distributed by World Film Company films.

Cast
Kitty Gordon - Nadine Trent
Irving Cummings - Rodney Gale
George MacQuarrie - Hollis Foster
Johnny Hines - Sammy Meyers
Pinna Nesbit - Maude Foster
Muriel Ostriche - Vera Seynave
Florence Coventry - Mrs. Seynave
Dore Davidson - Adolph Forman

References

External links
Merely Players at IMDb.com

1918 films
American silent feature films
Lost American films
American black-and-white films
Films directed by Oscar Apfel
World Film Company films
Silent American drama films
1918 drama films
Films with screenplays by Lillian Case Russell
1918 lost films
Lost drama films
1910s American films